Scariest Places on Earth is an American paranormal reality television series that originally aired from October 23, 2000, to October 29, 2006, on Fox Family, and later ABC Family. The show was hosted by Linda Blair, with narration by Zelda Rubinstein. The show featured reported cases of the paranormal by detailing the location's history, and then sending an ordinary family to visit the location in a reality TV-style vigil.

Synopsis
The series is hosted by Linda Blair, and narrated by Zelda Rubinstein. Alan Robson acted as an on-site correspondent. While the show is set in numerous locations around the world, the interstitial featuring Blair and Robson were shot in Los Angeles, California.

In a 2001 interview with Larry King, host Blair explained the series:
When we were kids, we used to tell ghost stories, but as we've gotten older -- I have friends who are scientific researchers, and I ask them questions. My mother has passed on. I choose to think she is in a wonderful, other place that we all will go. But I think that some people are trapped here... Well, these are the places that people have talked about for years, and years, that they go in, and you physically feel something is wrong. Some people do see things. Whether it's in a mind, we don't know.

Syndication
Reruns were aired on Syfy, which is a part of NBC Universal. It then aired on NBC Universal's now defunct horror- and suspense-themed cable channel Chiller.

Episodes

Featured locations

North America

Europe

Controversies
The main controversy with the show was that it was accused of fabricating some of the aired events. According to the documentary crew for a film on the Villisca axe murders, the segment which profiled the murder site—the Josiah B. and Sara Moore House—contained numerous falsities; among the allegations were that it featured a fake newspaper reproduction, photos of an unknown family presented as the murder victims, and an actress posing as a town resident.

Additionally, the "Devil Hunters" crew featured in the segment on the Jersey Devil claimed that the segment which ran thirteen minutes in length, had been edited from two days' worth of footage, and that numerous details were sensationalized and/or added in post-production.

See also
 Paranormal television
Apparitional experience
Parapsychology
Ghost hunting
Haunted locations in the United States

References

External links
 
 Watch episodes of Scariest Places on Earth on YouTube

2000 American television series debuts
2006 American television series endings
ABC Family original programming
English-language television shows
Fox Family Channel original programming
Paranormal reality television series